Chris Swanson is the co-founder of Secretly Group, which includes independent record labels Dead Oceans, Jagjaguwar, The Numero Group and Secretly Canadian, as well as music publisher Secretly Publishing. These labels are home to such acts as Bon Iver, The War On Drugs, Mitski, Moses Sumney, ANOHNI, Phoebe Bridgers, William Eggleston, Angel Olsen, Whitney, The Tallest Man on Earth, comedian Tig Notaro, Khruangbin, Dinosaur Jr., Phosphorescent, Unknown Mortal Orchestra, Jens Lekman, and Sharon Van Etten.

In 2011, Swanson co-founded the artist management company Fort William Artist Management, with Ami Spishock, Ben Swanson and Darius Van Arman. Some of Fort William's clients include The War on Drugs, Fleet Foxes, Grizzly Bear, Grouplove, Kevin Morby, Beirut, and producers Richard Swift, John Congleton, Joe Chiccarelli and Joey Waronker, among others.

In June 2019, Swanson was listed on the "Indie Power Players" list by Billboard magazine. He was also an executive producer on several Rick Alverson films, including Entertainment (2015), starring Michael Cera and John C. Reilly. Swanson continued his work in film by music supervising projects from Joe Swanberg, including: Drinking Buddies, Happy Christmas, Win It All, and three seasons of the Netflix series Easy. He also music supervised two seasons of the Amazon series, One Mississippi, as well as the Emmy-winning docuseries Wild Wild Country, created by Chapman and Maclain Way. His latest music supervision projects include Brett Haley's All The Bright Places and Hearts Beat Loud films, Jeff Tremaine's Mötley Crüe biopic, The Dirt, the Dare Me series for USA Network, and A Teacher, a new series for FX. In February 2020, Chris Swanson and Joe Rudge received a Guild of Music Supervisors Award for best music supervision- television movie for 'The Dirt'.

References

1975 births
Living people
American company founders
Record producers from Indiana